Ponton is an alternative spelling of pontoon. 

Ponton may also refer to:

Places
Great Ponton, a village in Lincolnshire, England
Little Ponton, a village in Lincolnshire, England

People
Lynn Ponton (born 1951), American child and adolescent psychiatrist
Mungo Ponton (1801–1880), 19th century Scottish inventor

Shannan Ponton (born 1973), Australian exercise instructor
Yvan Ponton (born 1945), Canadian actor, commentator and television host

Other
Ponton (automobile), a genre of automobile styling, 1930s-1960s

See also
 Pontoon (disambiguation)